Bob Woods (born January 24, 1968) is a Canadian ice hockey coach and former player. He is the assistant coach of the Minnesota Wild of the National Hockey League. He is a former National Hockey League assistant coach with the Buffalo Sabres, Anaheim Ducks and Washington Capitals.

Background
Born in 1968 in Leroy, Saskatchewan, Woods played in the Western Hockey League with the Brandon Wheat Kings. He was selected by the New Jersey Devils in the 10th round (201st overall) of the 1988 NHL Entry Draft and began his professional career in 1989 with the Utica Devils of the American Hockey League. Woods played the majority of his professional career in the ECHL where he played 599 games, scored 159 goals and 364 assists for 523 points, and earned 538 minutes in penalties. In 2012, Woods was honoured when he was inducted into the ECHL Hall of Fame.

He has been head coach of the Mississippi Sea Wolves, Hershey Bears, and Saskatoon Blades.

Personal
His son Brendan Woods was selected by the Carolina Hurricanes in the 5th round (129th overall) of the 2012 NHL Entry Draft.

Career statistics

Records
ECHL: Most career goals by a defenceman (159)

Awards
 WHL East Second All-Star Team – 1989

References

External links

1968 births
Living people
Anaheim Bullfrogs players
Anaheim Ducks coaches
Brandon Wheat Kings players
Buffalo Sabres coaches
Canadian ice hockey defencemen
Fort Wayne Komets players
Hampton Roads Admirals players
Hershey Bears coaches
Hershey Bears players
Johnstown Chiefs players
Minnesota Wild coaches
Mississippi Sea Wolves players
Mobile Mysticks players
New Jersey Devils draft picks
Nipawin Hawks players
Philadelphia Bulldogs players
Portland Pirates players
Portland Rage players
Saskatoon Blades coaches
Tallahassee Tiger Sharks players
Utica Blizzard players
Utica Devils players
Washington Capitals coaches
Wiener EV players
Canadian expatriate ice hockey players in Austria
Canadian expatriate ice hockey players in the United States
Canadian ice hockey coaches